is a fictional character in Arc System Works's Guilty Gear video game series. He first appeared in the 1998 video game Guilty Gear. In the series, Ky Kiske is the captain of the International Police Force, and later the king of the nation of Illyria. Talented with both sword and magic, he was the former commander of the Sacred Order of Holy Knights during the Holy War that was fought between mankind and the Gears, man-made bio-organic weapons.

Despite criticism about being a generic character or "nancy," video game reviewers have commended his fighting abilities and some of his personality traits. Additionally, his relationship with his main rival, Sol Badguy, that was compared to that of other notable video game characters, has been mostly met with positive critical reception.

Creation
Ky Kiske is named after Helloween members Kai Hansen and Michael Kiske. Ride the Lightning and Rising Force, two of his recurring techniques, are taken from the titles of Metallica and Yngwie Malmsteen albums, respectively. His theme song, "Holy Orders (Be Just or Be Dead)", is a reference to Iron Maiden's 1992 single "Be Quick or Be Dead".

Appearances
Orphaned at the age of 10 during the Holy War, a 100-year-war between mankind and bio-organic weapons called "Gears", he met the then-commander of the Sacred Order of Holy Knights (Seikishidan), Kliff Undersn. Ky was told to come back after five years of training if he really wanted to fight, and it was what he did. Due to the Undersn's retirement, the 16-year-old Ky Kiske was named the new chief of the Order. He led them to win, ending the war, and with its aim reached the Order was disbanded. Five years later, Ky entered the International Police Force, where he is the captain.

Ky enters a tournament that will select members for a second Sacred Order of Holy Knights at the start of Guilty Gear (1998) after hearing rumors of the possible resurrection of Justice, a Commander Gear who was in the leadership of the Gears during the Holy War. In Guilty Gear X (2000), Ky hears new rumors, these ones of a new Commander Gear that does not wish to harm humans—Dizzy. He sets out to find the flaws of his own concept of justice. In Guilty Gear X2 (2002), he returns to his normal duties as a captain of the IPF after rescuing a beaten Dizzy and entrusting her to Johnny's care. When he returns to work, Ky is thrust into a new conspiracy which includes robot clones of himself—called —, a secret organization, I-No, and his rival, Sol Badguy. In its sequel, Guilty Gear XX Accent Core Plus (2008), after discovering Post-War Administration Bureau's interest in Dizzy, Ky abandons his post in the police force to protect Dizzy and help her to control her power, the two of them eventually entering into a romantic relationship.

In Guilty Gear 2: Overture (2007), Ky is the king of a land called Illyria. He has a new sword as he is keeping Dizzy, now his wife, sealed within the Thunderseal's power to preserve her existence. Having grown much more mature and composed over the years, his rivalry and animosity towards Sol has diminished, having entrusted his half-Gear son, Sin, to Sol. However, he is at constant conflict towards his own ineptitude of being a father and a husband due to its bias regarding Gears.

Ky is a playable character in Guilty Gear Xrd (2014). He entrust his old friend Leo as his replacement of being a current king of Illriya. After Dizzy's return, his son, Sin begins to call him, "dad", much to Ky's happiness to hear it from his son. In the final chapters of the story mode during the Conclave's ambush in using Justice to attack Illriya, Ky was ambushed and being shot by the Conclave's member, Axus to death. However, Ky gets back on feet immediately to finish Axus. Upon awakened from Axus' fatal shots on him, Ky's left eye becomes red and has a gear mark, originating from a result of his relationship with Dizzy and the birth of Sin, resulting Ky to acquire a Uno Scale Gear Cell through exchanging half of his normal human eye with Sin's half of Gear eye at time after his son's birth. It was explained before revealing himself to have half of a Uno Gear Cell, his hair keeps growing fast many times because of that cells' rapid progress, and was originally meant for Dizzy's return. The main reason why he and Sin switched half of their eye is because his son's Gear power would become even more dangerous at full power. In a standalone sequel -Revelator-/Rev 2, Ky eventually found out Sol, Dizzy and Justice's connections, much to their dismay in horror. Despite his wife was exposed to the public and planning to move somewhere with his family, he is glad to hear the article news from a recently cured Elphelt that Dizzy is instead being praised as a savior during a last battle against Sanctus Maximus Ariels. Ky, who is very displease of Sol's parenting on Sin, intercepts Sol to discuss something with him privately outside the manor. Sol provoke Ky into battling him seriously when the former goads Dizzy as a monster. As Ky won, he found out Sol planned this for a preparation to settle with “That Man”, Asuka R. Kreutz the Gear Maker, who recently turned himself in to the government after the last battle against Ariels.

Ky return as a playable character in Guilty Gear Strive (2021), where he will eventually begin to use his implemented Gear Cell's power, which allows him to be able to use Dragon Install similar to Sol, but can only be usable at low health unlike his rival. Ky was originally planned to volunteer a G4 summit with his family, but eventually halted due to I-No's invasion on Ariels’ prison and thereby saving his family from being held hostages during Happy Chaos’ invasion on U.S. White House, whereas the third Illirya king Daryl took care of Ky's place as the kingdom's main representative in the summit. Whether the summit needs Sol Badguy for urgent help, the letters are often goes to Ky, due to Sol's returning to his usual bounty hunting career. He and a fully recovered Jack-O interrogates I-No, when she suddenly surrendered herself on purpose after releasing Happy Chaos from Ariels' body. Ky and Jack-O suspect there might be more than just one traps during Chaos' invasion in U.S. white house, or rather, the airship Tir Na Nog. Ky and Jack-O arrive on time, after Sol, Asuka and U.S. president Vernon got rid of Happy Chaos at a same time witnessing Asuka reverting Sol back to his former human-self Frederick Bulsara through removing the Flame of Corruption in him. Unfortunately, Sol's de-transformation back to Frederick is on a bad timing when Chaos is still on the airship, taking a form of one of Giovanna's boss from security agency, and using the real Tome of Origin which fused with Asuka to fuse the Gear Maker's former master himself with I-No, restoring her full godlike power which Chaos split. With the help of Axl Low and Chaos' former servant Nagoriyuki, Ky uses Uno's Dragon Install to weakeaned I-No, allowing Sol to kill her with a god-killer weapon Outrage, thereby saving the universe from being destroyed and reset multiple times. In the epilogue, he and Dizzy are visited by Testament, introducing them to their new family. In an the epilogue of Another Story A, set after White House incident in the main story, Ky, and his son and wife, Sin and Dizzy are at the Illyrian Castle to celebrate the latter’s ceremonial welcome as an official Gear representative leader to the world.

He is also a playable character in the spin-off games Guilty Gear Petit (2001), Isuka (2003), Dust Strikers (2006), and Judgment (2006). Along with Sol Badguy, he is the only character to appear in every Guilty Gear game.

Reception
In a 2013 poll conducted by Arc System Works, Ky was voted as the fourth most popular character from the series. IGN called Ky one of the cast "more generic characters". Also, they described him "the appalling bishonen horror of the 'nice guy'", and "just a bit of a nancy", citing his blond hair, soft voice, teacup hobby, and the fact that he is French as the reasons to qualify him with such adjective. However, they noted him as "one of the more well-rounded G[uilty ]G[ear ]X characters" and praised his fighting abilities as a character. Writing about the different fighting styles in the series, Siliconera stated he has a "more direct, hitstun-heavy playstyle" than other characters. Comparing him to BlazBlues Jin Kisaragi, Todd Ciolek from Anime News Network, though had found some similarities between Ky and Jin, declared they are not the same character "because Ky was amusingly over-earnest and sympathetic" which Ciolek claimed Jin is not.

His relation with Sol Badguy has also been commended. Ciolek described it as a "true relationship", and IGN's writer Ryan Clements qualified them as "a legendary pair", while Vincent Ingenito of the same site said "Ky and Sol might very well have been the next Ryu and Ken...or at least the next Scorpion and Sub-Zero". Writing for GameSpy, Benjamin Turner, who also praised his "great name", commented that the duo "are the closest you'll get to a Ken and Ryu, but they look approximately a thousand times cooler." On the same subject, but in other article, Clements, however, wrote that their clashes are "great melodrama".

References

Fictional French people in video games
Fictional half-demons
Fictional swordfighters in video games
Guilty Gear characters
King characters in video games
Fictional knights in video games
Male characters in video games
Fictional police officers in video games
Video game characters introduced in 1998
Video game characters with electric or magnetic abilities